Bundu (also Bondu, Bondou and Boundou) was a state in one of the West African countries which later became a French protectorate dependent on the colony of Senegal. It lay between the Falémé River and the upper course of the Gambia River, that is between 13 and 15 N., and 12 and 13 W.

Description
The country is an elevated plateau, with hills in the southern and central parts. These are generally unproductive, and covered with stunted wood; but the lower country is fertile, and finely clothed with the baobab, the tamarind and various valuable fruit-trees. Bondu is traversed by torrents, which flow rapidly during the rains but are empty in the dry season.

The inhabitants were mostly Fula, though the Mandinka of the area controlled trade. Most people were Muslim and the legal structure followed Islamic law, but it was not known as a strictly observant region.

History
Bondu was controlled by Mande rulers until the second half of the 17th century when Muslim Fulas took over in what is regarded as the first of the Fula jihads in West Africa.

Mungo Park, the first European traveller to visit the country, passed through Bondu in 1795, and had to submit to many exactions from the reigning monarch. The royal residence was then at Fatteconda; but when Major William Gray, a British officer who attempted to solve the Niger problem, visited Bondu in 1818 it had been moved to Bulibani (Boolibany), a village with a population of 1500–1800, surrounded by a strong clay wall. In August 1845 the king of Bondu signed a treaty recognizing French sovereignty over his country. The treaty was disregarded by the natives, but in 1858 Bondu came definitively under French control.

Notable people
Ayuba Suleiman Diallo (1701—1773), slave trader who was enslaved by the Mandinka
Richard Pierpoint, freed slave, British Army soldier and farmer in Fergus, Ontario Canada

References

Sources

Further reading

History of Senegal
French West Africa
Fula history